Ashbourne is a civil parish and a town in the Derbyshire Dales district of Derbyshire, England.  The parish contains over 160 listed buildings that are recorded in the National Heritage List for England.  Of these, three are listed at Grade I, the highest of the three grades, eleven are at Grade II*, the middle grade, and the others are at Grade II, the lowest grade.  Ashbourne has been a market town since the 13th century, and it stood on the old road from London to Manchester.  Most of the listed buildings are houses, cottages and associated structures, shops and offices.  The other listed buildings include churches and chapels, hotels and public houses, schools, almshouses, public buildings, banks, a milestone, a former toll house, a former railway engine house, a war memorial arch, and telephone kiosks.


Key

Buildings

References

Citations

Sources

 

Lists of listed buildings in Derbyshire
Listed